WJLE (1480 AM) and WJLE-FM (101.7 FM are a pair of American radio stations broadcasting a country music format. The duopoly is licensed to Smithville, Tennessee. The stations are currently owned by the Center Hill Broadcasting Corporation.

References

External links

JLE-FM
Country radio stations in the United States